The T.M. Ferguson House is a historic house on Canaan Street in Marshall, Arkansas.  It is a single-story wood-frame structure, with a hip roof, clapboard siding, and two interior brick chimneys.  A porch extends across part of the front, supported by a variety of columns, including some Victorian-style turned posts.  The house was built between 1900 and 1903 by T.M. Ferguson, and is of local architectural significance for its vernacular hip roof.

The house was listed on the National Register of Historic Places in 1993.

See also
National Register of Historic Places listings in Searcy County, Arkansas

References

Houses on the National Register of Historic Places in Arkansas
Houses in Searcy County, Arkansas
National Register of Historic Places in Searcy County, Arkansas